The Drăguiasa is a left tributary of the river Vișeu in Romania. It discharges into the Vișeu in Vișeu de Jos.

References

Rivers of Romania
Rivers of Maramureș County